Choo-Ha, Tamcach-Ha and Multun-Ha are a series of small cenotes close to the Mayan site of Cobá in central Yucatán Peninsula. All of them are accessible to the public for swimming. Choo-Ha has a small entrance of only about 3 by 4 meters.

Fauna 

Small fish and turtles live in this cenote. Visitors must take a shower to clean themselves before swimming.

References

Caves of Mexico
Landforms of Quintana Roo
Limestone caves
Sinkholes of Mexico
Tourist attractions in Quintana Roo
Underwater diving sites in Mexico